The Faroe Islands elects on the national level a legislature. The Faroese Parliament (Løgtingið in Faroese) has 33 members of parliament, elected for a four-year term by proportional representation. The Faroe Islands have a multi-party system (disputing on independence and unionism as well as left and right), with numerous parties in which a single party normally does not have a chance of gaining power alone, and therefore the parties must work together in order to form a coalition government.

Latest elections

Past elections and referendums

 JF – Social-Democrats (Equality Party)
 SF – Union Party (have been in coalition with the Labour Front and the Self-Government Party at some elections)
 TF – Republican Party
 FF – People's Party
 SSF – Self-Government Party
 MF – Centre Party
 KFF – Christian People's Party
 VF – Workers' Movement
 F – Progress

1984
JF – 23.4%, 8 MPs
FF – 21.6%, 7 MPs
SF – 21.2%, 7 MPs
TF – 19.5%, 6 MPs
SSF – 8.5%, 2 MPs
KFF – 5.8%, 2 MPs

1988
FF – 23.2%, 8 MPs
JF – 21.6%, 7 MPs
SF – 21.2%, 7 MPs
TF – 16.2%, 6 MPs
SSF – 7.1%, 2 MPs
KFF – 5.5%, 2 MPs
Others – 2.2%, 0 MPs

1990
JF – 27.5%, 10 MPs
FF – 21.9%, 7 MPs
SF – 18.9%, 6 MPs
TF – 14.7%, 4 MPs
SSF – 8.8%, 3 MPs
KFF – 5.9%, 2 MPs
Others – 2.3%, 0 MPs

1994
SF – 23.4%, 8 MPs
FF – 16.0%, 6 MPs
JF – 15.4%, 5 MPs
TF – 13.7%, 4 MPs
VF – 9.5%, 3 MPs
KFF – 6.3%, 2 MPs
MF – 5.8%, 2 MPs
SSF – 5.6%, 2 MPs
Others – 4.3%, 0 MPs

1998
TF – 23.8%, 8 MPs
JF – 21.9%, 7 MPs
FF – 21.3%, 8 MPs
SF – 18.0%, 6 MPs
SSF – 7.7%, 2 MPs
MF – 4.1%, 1 MPs
KFF – 2.5%, 0 MPs
VF – 0.8%, 0 MPs
Others – 0.8%, 0 MPs

2002
SF – 26.0%, 8 MPs
TF – 23.7%, 8 MPs
JF – 20.9%, 7 MPs
FF – 20.8%, 7 MPs
SSF – 4.4%, 1 MPs
MF – 4.2%, 1 MP

2004
SF – 23.7%, 7 MPs  
JF – 21.8%, 7 MPs
TF – 21.7%, 8 MPs
FF – 20.6%, 7 MPs
MF – 5.2%, 2 MPs
SSF – 4.6%, 1 MP

2008
TF – 23.3%, 8 MPs
SF – 21%, 7 MPs
FF – 20.1%, 7 MPs
JF – 19.4%, 6 MPs
MF – 8.4%, 3 MPs
SSF – 7.2%, 2 MPs
Others – 0.7%, 0 MPs

2011
SF – 24.7%, 8 MPs
TF – 23.3%, 8 MPs
FF – 18.3%, 6 MPs
JF – 17.7%, 6 MPs
F – 6.3%, 2 MPs
MF – 6.2%, 2 MPs
SSF – 4.2%, 1 MP

2015
JF – 25.1%, 8 MPs
TF – 20.7%, 7 MPs
FF – 18.9%, 6 MPs
SF – 18.7%, 6 MPs
F – 7.0%, 2 MPs
MF – 5.5%, 2 MPs
SSF – 4.1%, 2 MPs

See also
 Electoral calendar
 Electoral system

External links
Statistics Faroe Islands: Election results 1906-present